Nero is an Italian-British-Spanish television film, part of the Imperium series; it was made film available on DVD as of November 2005 in the U.S. and Canada. Produced by EOS Entertainment and Lux Vide for RAI and Telecinco.

Plot
As a young boy, future emperor Nero witnesses the mad Emperor Caligula kill his father and exile his mother. While in exile in the pontine islands, Agrippina, his mother, sees a vision telling her that her son can become emperor, but she will have to die first. She accepts the proposal. Back in Rome, Nero, now being raised by emperor Claudius after Caligula's death, Agrippina returns. She poisons Claudius' food and Nero becomes emperor. At first, Nero cuts taxes and introduces successful programs and invades Brittania. Soon he meets a beautiful slave named Claudia Acte, and marries her, throwing off his engagement with Claudius' daughter, Claudia Octavia, telling her she can marry someone she will be happy with. Heartbroken, she arrives at an island and kills herself. Nero enjoys being married to Claudia Acte, but soon he gradually goes mad with power and sets fire to Rome. He divorces Acte, and forces the citizens to watch hour long recitals, and at one of these, accidentally kills his new pregnant wife, Poppaea Sabina. He kills several members of the senate and orders his mother to be stabbed, where she says: "Strike the womb, for that is what bore him." Nero's madness soon causes a riot, causing himself to flee the city in disguise, and slit his wrists under the saddened embrace of Claudia Acte, his once passionate lover.

The movie in many ways tries to show Nero as a good soul gone mad, beginning as a brilliant young prince enduring injustice, then hailed enthusiastically at the beginning of his reign, implementing much-needed reforms and enjoying immense popularity. Half the film concentrates on Nero's teenage years and his love life with Acte.

Historical flaws
His relationship with Claudia Acte is altered, and its influence on his divorce from Claudia Octavia exaggerated. In fact after Nero's divorce from Octavia he married his pregnant mistress Poppaea Sabina who had married twice before marrying Nero (Rufrius Crispinus and the future Emperor Otho). Poppaea Sabina's death is portrayed differently than how it reportedly occurred. According to the historical sources, she was kicked to death by Nero in a vicious rage. The film also omits Nero's other reported attempts to kill his mother Agrippina the Younger, first by poisoning. In his second attempt he had his mother's mattress fixed so that when she lay down, a decoration on the ceiling would fall onto the bed. A third attempt involved sabotaging a ship Agrippina was traveling on, but she managed to swim to shore. The fourth attempt, in which a soldier killed her on the spot, is shown in the movie as Agrippina walks toward the soldier and tells him, "Strike the womb that bore him". In the film Nero is shown to have a fixation on playing the harp, which is only partly true. In a late part of the movie Nero is shown playing his harp in the center of a Roman Theatre as Emperor around 62 A.D. This is fiction, because Nero never played his harp in front of a large audience. He usually played it in isolation or within a small group of friends.

At the end, Nero escapes from the city by himself and slits his wrists where he is embraced by Acte. In reality, Nero escaped from the city in disguise to the house of one of his loyal freedmen; there he committed suicide by stabbing himself in the neck. However, he botched the job and had to have a slave finish him job off.

The Emperor Caligula is also altered. In the film, Caligula banishes Agrippina, Nero's mother, as he did in reality, but in reality, both Agrippina and Julia Livilla were exiled, yet Livilla is not even mentioned in the film. The assassination of Caligula is also depicted inaccurately. In the film, Caligula is lured to a brothel by his attendants, where he is assassinated. Historically, he was killed in a cryptoporticus underneath a palatine theater by praetorian guards led by Cassius Chaerea, Marcus Vinicius, and Lucius Annius Vinicianus. After Caligula was murdered, his wife and daughter were eliminated.

The film's budget was around €800,000. It was filmed on location in Sicily and Tunisia in late 2004 and early 2005.

Cast 
 Hans Matheson - Nero
 Laura Morante - Agrippina
 Rike Schmid - Acte
 Simón Andreu - Porridus
 Sonia Aquino - Messalina
 Maria Gabriella Barbuti - Licia
 James Bentley - Young Nero
 Marco Bonini - Rufus
 Robert Brazil - Gaius Silius
 Philippe Caroit - Apollonius
 Todd Carter - Senator # 1
 Massimo Dapporto - Claudius
 Maurizio Donadoni - Burrus
 Emanuela Garuccio - Claudia
 Matthias Habich - Seneca
 Klaus Händl - Pallas
 Jochen Horst - Etius
 Ruby Kammer - Marzia
 Ángela Molina - Domitia
 Mario Opinato - Tigellinus
 Vittoria Puccini - Octavia
 Ian Richardson - Septimus
 Paolo Scalabrino - Senator # 2
 John Simm - Caligula
 Liz Smith - Soothsayer
 Elisa Tovati - Poppea
 Pierre Vaneck - Paul of Tarsus
 Francesco Venditti - Britannicus

Crew 
 Directed by: Paul Marcus
 Teleplay by: Paul Billing & Francesco Contaldo
 Produced by: Luca Bernabei
 Director of Photography: Giovanni Galasso
 Production Designer: Paolo Biagetti
 Edited by: Alessandro Lucidi
 Costume Designer: Paolo Scalabrino
 Music By: Andrea Guerra

See also
 List of historical drama films
 List of films set in ancient Rome

References

External links 
 

2004 television films
2004 films
Depictions of Nero on television
Depictions of Caligula on television
Cultural depictions of Claudius
Cultural depictions of Agrippina the Younger
Cultural depictions of Poppaea Sabina
Cultural depictions of Messalina
Cultural depictions of Seneca the Younger
Cultural depictions of Britannicus
Cultural depictions of Claudia Octavia
Italian drama films
British drama films
Spanish drama films
English-language television shows
Television dramas set in ancient Rome
Films set in ancient Rome
Films set in the Roman Empire
Films set in the 1st century
Films set in classical antiquity
Biographical films about Roman emperors
2000s English-language films
2000s British films